Eslamabad-e Pain (also Romanized as Eslāmābād-e Pā’īn; also known as Eslāmābād) is a village in Bahu Kalat Rural District, Dashtiari District, Chabahar County, Sistan and Baluchestan Province, Iran. At the 2006 census, its population was 741, in 198 families.

References 

Populated places in Chabahar County